St. Stanislaus College may refer to:

Africa
 St. Stanislaus College (Guyana), a senior secondary school in Georgetown

Australia
 St Stanislaus' College (Bathurst), a Catholic day and boarding high school for boys in New South Wales
 St. Stanislaus College, a predecessor of Emmaus College, Rockhampton in Park Avenue, Queensland

Europe
 Beaumont College, formerly St. Stanislaus College, a public school in Old Windsor, England
 St Stanislaus College or Tullabeg College, a school in County Offaly, Ireland from 1818 to 1886
 St Stanislas College, Delft, (Dutch, Stanislascollege) a conglomerate of high schools in Delft, Pijnacker, and Rijswijk
 Collège Saint-Stanislas, Mons, Belgium

India
 St. Stanislaus High School, founded in 1863 as an orphanage and now a Catholic day and boarding school for boys located in Mumbai

United States
 Pio Nono College (Georgia), a college in Macon, known as St. Stanislaus College from 1883 until closure in 1920
 Saint Stanislaus College, a Catholic day and boarding middle school and high school for boys in Bay St. Louis, Mississippi
 St. Stanislaus College (Chicago), a catholic high school in Chicago, Illinois